Perth is an unincorporated community in New Castle County, Delaware, United States. Perth is located northwest of Delaware Route 261 between Shipley and Silverside Roads, to the northeast of Wilmington. It is not to be confused with Perth, Western Australia or Perth, Scotland.

References 

Unincorporated communities in New Castle County, Delaware
Unincorporated communities in Delaware